Among the fairly large repertoire for the standard piano trio (violin, cello, and piano) are the following works:

Ordering is by surname of composer.

A

Els Aarne
Piano Trio (1946)

Trio per pianoforte, violino e violoncello (1842)
Kati Agócs
Piano Trio No. 1, Queen of Hearts (2017) 
Miguel del Águila
 Tango Trio (2002)
 Disagree! (2017)
Japanese Gardens (1996)
Boundaries 2 (2002)
Doppler Effect, version for violin, cello, piano (2005)
Images (rev. 2008)
Lullaby for Piano Trio (v. 2008)
Musescapes (2009)
A Golden Celebration (2014)
Franghiz Ali-Zadeh
Impromptus (2004)
Charles-Valentin Alkan
Piano Trio in G minor,  Op. 30 (1841)
Berta Alves de Sousa
Piano Trio (1974)
Alexander Alyabyev
Piano Trio in E-flat major in one movement (1812)
Piano Trio in A minor (1820)
 Fikret Amirov
 To the Memory of Ghadsibekov, second version, poem for violin, cello and piano (1953)
Andrew Anderson
Piano Trio in E minor: "The Heart" (2013)
Volkmar Andreae
Piano Trio No. 1, Op. 1 (1899)
Piano Trio No. 2 in E major, Op. 14

Elfrida Andrée
Piano Trio No.1 in C minor (1860)
Piano Trio No.2 in G minor (1884)
Iosif Andriasov
 Trio for violin, cello and piano, Op. 7 (1957)
George Antheil
Trio (1950) 
Georges Aperghis
 Trio (2012)
Violet Archer
Piano Trio No. 1 (1954)
Piano Trio No. 2 (1957)
Anton Arensky
Piano Trio No. 1 in D minor, Op. 32 (1894)
Piano Trio No. 2 in F minor, Op. 73 (1905)
Cecilia Arizti
Chamber Trio for piano, violin and cello (1893)
Malcolm Arnold
Piano Trio, Op. 54 (1956)
Claude Arrieu
Piano Trio (1957)
 Lera Auerbach
 Piano Trio, Op. 28 (1992–1996)
 Postlude, encore piece for piano trio (2006)
 Piano Trio No. 2, Triptych - This Mirror Has Three Faces (2012)
 Piano Trio No. 3 (2013)
Piano Trio (2017)
Ernest Austin
Piano Trio No. 1
Piano Trio No. 2, In Field and Forest, Op. 15 (c. 1908)
Piano Trio No. 3
Piano Trio No. 4 in D major, Op. 26  (c. 1909)
Piano Trio No. 5, Folk Tune Fantasy, Op. 65

B

 Arno Babadzhanyan
 Piano Trio in F minor (1953)
Vera Baeva
Piano Trio (1986)
Judith Bailey
Microminiature for Piano Trio No. 1, Op. 68 (2000)
David N. Baker
Contrasts (1976) for violin, violoncello, and piano
Roots (1976) for violin, violoncello, and piano
Roots II (1992) for violin, violoncello, and piano
Jeanne Barbillion
Piano Trio (1928)
Woldemar Bargiel
Piano Trio No. 1 in F major, Op. 6 (1851)
Piano Trio No. 2 in E major, Op. 20 (1860)
Piano Trio No. 3 in B major, Op. 37 (1870)
Vytautas Barkauskas
Modus vivendi, Op. 108 (1996)
Ethel Barns
Piano Trio No. 1 in F minor (1904)
Piano Trio No. 2
Fantasy Trio for 2 Violins and Piano, Op. 26 (1912)
Bela Bartók
Contrasts for Clarinet, Violin & Piano (1938)
Roland Batik (b. August 19, 1951)
Four Intermezzi for Piano Trio
René-Emmanuel Baton
Trio for piano, violin and cello, Op. 31 (1924)
Arnold Bax
Piano Trio in B-flat major (1946)
Amy Beach
Piano Trio in A minor, Op. 150 (1938)
Sally Beamish
Piobaireachd for Piano Trio (1991)
The Seafarer Trio for Narrator and Piano Trio (2000)
Carnival Samba for Piano Trio (2003)
La Mer, Debussy arranged for Piano Trio (2013-2015) 
Dance the Beginning of the World for Piano Trio (2017)
Janet Beat
Piano Trio (2007-2009)
Ludwig van Beethoven
Piano Trio in E, WoO. 38 (1791, published 1830)
Allegretto in B major WoO. 39  (1791, published 1830)
Piano Trios Nos. 1-3 (E major, G major, C minor), Op. 1 (1795)
Piano Trio No. 4 in B major (alternate version of the trio for clarinet, violoncello and piano), Op. 11 (1798)
Piano Trio (arrangement - with Beethoven's approval, possibly by him - of the second symphony in D major, Op. 36)
Piano Trio (arrangement of Septet in E major, Op. 20), Op. 38 (1805)
Variations for Piano Trio in E major, Op. 44 (1792)
Piano Trio (arrangement of string quintet in E major, Op.4), Op. 63 (1806)
2 Piano Trios (D major "Ghost", E major), Op. 70 (1809)
Piano Trio No. 7 in B major "Archduke", Op. 97 (1816)
Kakadu Variations for Piano Trio in G major, Op. 121a (1803)
Alan Beggerow
Piano Trio No. 3
Leonard Bernstein
Piano Trio (1937)
Louise Bertin
Piano Trio in B-flat major, Op. 10 (1875)
Henri Bertini (28 October 1798 – 30 September 1876)
 Trio pour piano, violon, et basse, no 1, Op. 20
 Trio pour piano, violon, et basse, no 2, Op. 21
 Trio pour piano, violon, et basse, no 3, Op. 22
 Grand Trio for piano, violin and cello Op.43
 Grand Trio for piano, violin and cello Op.48
 Trio pour piano, violon, et basse, Op. 70
Franz Berwald
Piano Trio in C (1845)
Piano Trio No. 1 in E flat (1849)
Piano Trio No. 2 in F minor (1851)
Piano Trio No. 3 in D minor (1851)
Piano Trio No. 4 in C major (1853)
Judith Bingham
Chapman's Pool (1997)

Richard Birchall
Contours (2014)
Renate Birnstein
Les formules magiques (1998/1999)*Harrison Birtwistle
Trio (2010)
Chester Biscardi
Trio (1976)
Leopoldine Blahetka
Piano Trio, Op. 5
Ernest Bloch
Three Nocturnes for Piano Trio (1924)
Piano Trio (1925)
Sylvie Bodorová
Pre-Visions, Fresques for piano trio (1983)
Megiddo for violin, cello and piano (2001)
La Speranza for clarinet, cello and piano (1993)
Raffiche di vento for flute, viola and cello (2009)
Vallja e malit - Dancing Mountain for violin, clarinet and piano (2017)
Léon Boëllmann
Piano Trio in G major, Op. 19 (1895)
Victoria Bond
Trio: Other Selves (1979)
Mel Bonis
Suite orientale for Piano Trio, Op. 48 (1900)
Soir, matin for Piano Trio, Op. 76 (1907)
Prach Boondiskulchok
Night Suite (2014)
Alexander Borodin
Piano Trio in D major (1850-1860 [3 movements only, last movement lost])
Edith Borroff
Piano Trio (1983)
Sergei Bortkiewicz
 Trio for piano, violin and cello, Op. 38 (1928)
Henriëtte Bosmans
Piano Trio (1921)
Marco Enrico Bossi
Trio in D minor, Op. 107 (1896)
Trio sinfonico in D major, Op. 123 (1901)
Lili Boulanger
Deux pièces en trio (1918)
York Bowen
Phantasie Trio for Violin, Cello (or Viola) and Piano, Op.24
Rhapsody Trio for Violin, Violoncello and Piano in A minor, Op.80 (1926)
Trio in 3 Movements in E minor for violin, cello and piano, Op. 118 (1945)
Johannes Brahms
Piano Trio No. 1 in B major, Op. 8 (1854; revised 1891)
Piano Trio No. 2 in C major, Op. 87 (1882)
Piano Trio No. 3 in C minor, Op. 101 (1886)
Piano Trio No. 4 in A major, Op. posth. (debated)
Charlotte Bray
That Crazed Smile (2014)
Those Secret Eyes (2014)
Frank Bridge
Phantasie Trio (Piano Trio No. 1) (1907)
Piano Trio No. 2, H. 178 (1929)
Hans Bronsart von Schellendorff
Piano Trio in G minor, Op. 1 (1853?)
James Francis Brown
Piano Trio (2012)
Max Bruch
Piano Trio in C minor, Op.5 (1857)
Ignaz Brüll
Piano Trio in E-flat major, Op.14 (ca. 1872)
Linda Buckley
Galura (2008) for Piano Trio and Electronics
Eivind Buene
Landscape with Ruins (2007)
Diana Burrell
Frieze (2019)
Adolf Busch
Piano Trio No.1 in A Minor, Op.15 (1919)
Ferruccio Busoni
Andante with Variations and Scherzo, Op.18a, BV 184 (1881)

C

Charles Wakefield Cadman
Piano Trio, Op.56 (1908–1913)
Joseph Callaerts
Piano Trio in A minor, Op.16 (1882)
Charles Camilleri
Piano Trio (2005)

Piano Trio, Op. 24, No. 1 (1928-1929)
Ann Carr-Boyd
Combinations for Piano Trio (1973)
Elliott Carter
Epigrams (2012)
Dinorá de Carvalho
Trio No. 1 (1950)
Alfredo Casella
Sonata a Tre (Piano Trio), Op. 62 (1938)
Gaspar Cassadó
Piano Trio in C major (1926/1929)
Alexis de Castillon
Piano Trio No.1 in B-flat major, Op.4 (1865)
Piano Trio No.2 in D minor, Op.17 (1873?)
Eve de Castro-Robinson
At water's birth (2008)
Georgy Catoire
Piano Trio in F minor, Op.14 (1900)
Friedrich Cerha
Trio (2005)
Cécile Chaminade
Piano Trio No. 1 in G minor, Op. 11 (1880)
Piano Trio No. 2 in A minor, Op. 34 (1886)
Ernest Chausson
Piano Trio in G minor, Op. 3 (1881)
Gayane Chebotaryan
Piano Trio (1945)
Chen Yi (composer)
Tibetan Tunes (2008)
Tunes From My Home
Camille Chevillard
Piano Trio in F major, Op. 3 (1884)
Inga Chinilina
Piano Trio (2021)
Shai Cohen
Manifesto (2022)
Frédéric Chopin
Piano Trio in G minor, Op. 8 (1829)
Hedwige Chrétien
Trio en ut mineur pour violon, violoncelle et piano
Francesco Cilea
Piano Trio in D major (ca. 1890)
Rebecca Clarke
Piano Trio (1921)

Rhona Clarke
Dunsandle (1988)
Piano Trio No. 2 (2001, rev. 2007)
Piano Trio No. 3 (2002)
A Different Game, Piano Trio No 4 (2016)
Ann Cleare
Day Two (2006)
93 million miles away (2016)
Anna Clyne
A Thousand Mornings for piano trio (2020)
Gloria Coates
Lyric Suite (1993/1996) 
Reine Colaço Osorio-Swaab
Trio for Piano Trio No. 2 (1941)
Samuel Coleridge-Taylor
Piano Trio in E minor (1893)

Canto rosso per P. (2007)
Trio (for violin, cello and piano) (2013)
David Conte
Trio for Violin, Cello, and Piano (2011)
Aaron Copland
Vitebsk: Study on a Jewish Theme for Piano Trio (1928)
Prelude for piano trio
Eleanor Cory
Designs for Piano Trio (1979)
Conversation for Piano Trio (2004)
Luís Ferreira da Costa
Piano trio in C minor, Op. 15
Cindy Cox
la mar amarga (2007)
Wave (2010)
Helen C. Crane
Piano Trio in E major, Op. 20 (published in 1907)
Piano Trio in B-flat major, Op. 72 (1924-1927)
Jean Cras
Piano Trio in C (1907)
Piano Trio (1926)
Carl Czerny
Trois Sonatines faciles et brillantes pour le pianoforte seul ou avec accomp. d'un violon et violoncelle ad libitum, Op. 104 (1826)
Piano Trio No. 1 in E major, Op. 105 (alternative version of a violin, horn and piano trio) (1826)
Piano Trio No. 2 in A major, Op. 166 (1829)
Piano Trio No. 3 in E major, Op. 173 (1829)
Piano Trio No. 4 in A minor, Op. 289 (ca. 1833)
Two Piano Trios in C major and A major, Op. 211 (ca. 1825)
Six Grand Potpourris for piano trio, Op. 212 (ca. 1825)
Fantasia concertante for piano, flute and cello, Op. 256 (ca. 1835)

D

Cecilia Damström
Summer Memories, Op. 42 (2015)
Félicien David
Piano trio no. 1 in E major (1857)
Piano trio no. 2 in D minor (1857)
Piano trio no. 3 in C minor (1857)
Tina Davidson
Bodies In Motion for violin, cello and piano (with optional soprano, marimba) (2001)
Blue Like an Orange (2009)
Music for the Season (2010)
Tremble (2013)
Peter Maxwell Davies
A Voyage to Fair Isle (2002)
William L. Dawson (composer)
Piano Trio in A major (1925)
Charles Auguste de Bériot
Piano Trio in D major sur des motifs de l'opera 'Robin des Bois', Op.4 (ca. 1820)
Piano Trio No.2 in D major, Op. 58 (ca. 1845)
Piano Trio No.3 (ca. 1845)
Claude Debussy
Piano Trio in G major, L. 3 (1880)
Arthur De Greef
Piano Trio in F minor (1935)
David Del Tredici
Grand Trio (2001)
 Edison Denisov
 Trio for violin, cello and piano, Op. 5 (1954) (dedicated to Dmitri Shostakovich)
 Trio for violin, cello and piano, Op. 39 (1971)

Emma Lou Diemer
Piano Trio (2001)
Albert Dietrich
Piano Trio No.1 in C minor, Op.9 (1855)
Piano Trio No.2 in A major, Op.14 (1863)
Violeta Dinescu
Ichthys (1991)
Et pourtant c’est mieux qu’en hiver... (2000)
Ignacy Feliks Dobrzyński
Grand Trio, A minor, Op. 17 (1832)
Johanna Doderer
Piano Trio (2002; DWV 31)
Second Piano Trio (2008; DWV 52)
Third Piano Trio (2009; DWV 64)
Morgen (2013; DWV 79)
Fourth Piano Trio (2016; DWV 110; numbered as no. 5 at https://db.musicaustria.at/)
Théodore Dubois
Piano Trio No.1, C minor
Piano Trio No.2, E major
Canon for Piano Trio
Pascal Dusapin
Trio Rombach, for piano, violin or clarinet and cello (1997)
Antonín Dvořák
Piano Trio No. 1 in B major, Op. 21/B. 51 (1875)
Piano Trio No. 2 in G minor, Op. 26/B. 56 (1876)
Piano Trio No. 3 in F minor (once listed as Op. 64), Op. 65/B. 130 (1883)
Piano Trio No. 4 in E minor ("Dumky"), Op. 90/B. 166 (1891)

Piano Trio in C minor, Op.25 (1910)

E

Sophie Carmen Eckhardt-Gramatté
Piano Trio, E. 157 (1967)
Katharine Emily Eggar
Piano Trio in G minor (1905)
Fantasy Trio for Piano Trio in E minor
Rhapsodic Impression for violin, viola and piano (1928)
Klaus Egge
Piano Trio, Op. 14 (1941)
Maija Einfelde
Trio (1984)
Adagio (1994)
Trio for Violin, Cello and Piano (2016) 
Edward Elgar
Douce Pensée (1882)
Three Movements for Piano Trio (1924)

Rosalind Ellicott
Piano Trio No. 1 in G major (1889)
Piano Trio No. 2 in D minor (1891)
George Enescu
Piano Trio in G minor (1897)
Sérénade Lointaine for Piano Trio (1903)
Piano Trio in A minor (1916)
Sven Einar Englund
Trio (1982)
Iván Erőd
Trio No. 1 for Violin, Violoncello and Piano, Op. 21 (1976)
Trio No. 2 for Violin, Violoncello and Piano, Op. 42 (1982)

F

Louise Farrenc
Piano Trio No. 1 in E major, Op. 33 (1844)
Piano Trio No. 2 in D minor, Op. 34 (1844)
Arthur Farwell
Owasco Memories for Piano Trio, Op. 8 (1901) 	
The Gods of the Mountain for Piano Trio, Op. 52 (1917)
Gabriel Fauré
Piano Trio in D minor, Op. 120 (1923)
Sarah Feigin
Elegie in Memoriam Yitzhak Rabin for Piano Trio (1995)
Morton Feldman
Trio, for violin, cello, and piano (1980)

Wintermusic (1983)

Trio in D Major, Op. 54
Richard Festinger
 Tapestries (1997)
Zdeněk Fibich
Piano Trio in F minor (1872)
Vivian Fine
Piano Trio (1980)
Graciane Finzi
Trio (1975)
Elena Firsova
Piano Trio No. 1, Op. 8 (1972)
Piano Trio No. 2, Mad Vision (1993)
Josef Bohuslav Foerster
Piano Trio No. 1 in F minor, Op. 8 (1883)
Piano Trio No. 2 in B major, Op. 38 (1894)
Piano Trio No. 3 in A minor, Op. 105 (1919-1921)
Alexandra Fol
Watching the Stars Over the Rhodopi Mountains in Silence trio (version for violin, violoncello and piano) (2010)
Jacqueline Fontyn
Trio (1956)
Lieber Joseph (2007)
Ferne Spuren (2009)
Arthur Foote
Piano Trio No. 1 in C minor, Op. 5 (1883)
Piano Trio No. 2 in B major, Op. 65 (1907–08)
Antonio Fragoso
Trio Minor for Violin, Cello and Piano in C Major (1916)
Jean Françaix
Piano Trio i D Major (1986)

Cheryl Frances-Hoad
Melancholia (2002)
My Fleeting Angel (2005)
The Forgiveness Machine (2010)
César Franck
Piano Trio No. 1 in F minor, Op. 1, No. 1 (1842)
Piano Trio No. 2 in B major, Op. 1, No. 2 "Trio de salon" (1842)
Piano Trio No. 3 in B minor, Op. 1, No. 3 (1842)
Piano Trio No. 4 in B minor, Op. 2 (1842)
Eduard Franck
Piano Trio in E major, WoO (published in 2012 by Pfefferkorn)
Piano Trio No. 1 in E minor, Op. 11 (1848)
Piano Trio No. 2 in E major, Op. 22 (1852)
Piano Trio No. 3 in E major, Op. 53 (1856) [The German National Library and Audite site list this work as being in D major, while IMSLP says E♭ major.]
Piano Trio No. 4 in D major, Op. 58 (1861)
Richard Franck
Piano Trio No.1 in B minor, Op.20 (1893)
Piano Trio No.2 in E Major, Op.32 (1900)
Gabriela Lena Frank
Four Folk Songs (2012)
Sean Friar
Hell-bent (2006)
Peter Fribbins
Piano Trio (2003 - 2004)
"Softly in the dusk..." for piano trio (2006 - 2007)
"Variations on a Burns Air" for piano trio (2009)
Bohdana Frolyak
Lamento for piano trio (2007)
Carl Frühling
Piano Trio in E major, Op. 32 (ca. 1900)
Trio for Clarinet, Cello, and Piano, Op. 40 (1925)
Gunnar de Frumerie
Piano Trio No. 2, Op. 45 (1952)
Robert Fuchs
Piano Trio No. 1 in C major, Op. 22 (1879)
Piano Trio No. 2 in B major, Op. 72 (1903)
Piano Trio No.3 in F minor, Op. 115 (1921)
Kenji Fujimura
Echoes of the Silver Screen (2015)
Music for One, Two, and Three... (2021)
Vivian Fung
Scherzo (1998)
Beat Furrer
retour an dich (1984)

Piano Trio, Op. 65

G

Niels Wilhelm Gade
Piano trio in B major (1839)
Five Novelletten, Op. 29 (1853)
Trio in F major, Op. 42 (1863)
Hans Gál
Variations on an Old Viennese Heurigen Melody, Op.9 (1914)
Piano Trio in E major, Op. 18 (1923)
Trio for violin (or flute, oboe), cello and piano. Op. 49b (1949)
German Galynin
Trio (1947)
Stacy Garrop
Seven for Piano Trio (1998)
Silver Dagger for Piano Trio (2009)
Jubilation for Piano Trio (2011)
Sanctuary for Piano Trio (2013)
The Solitude of Stars (2020)
Beacon of the Bay (2021)
Lūcija Garūta
Trio in B-flat major (1948)
Ada Gentile
Serene Ombre (2011)
Harald Genzmer
Piano Trio in F major
Friedrich Gernsheim
Piano Trio No. 1 in F major, Op. 28 (1872)
Piano Trio No. 2 [No.4], B major, Op. 37 (1877)
Two other piano trios (in manuscript form)
Giorgio Federico Ghedini
Due Intermezzi (1915)
Peter Gilbert (composer)
Sternbilder (2020)
Philip Glass
Head On (1967)
Mikhail Glinka
Trio Pathétique in D minor (1832)
Benjamin Godard
Piano Trio No. 1 in G minor, Op. 32 (1880)
Piano Trio No. 2 in F major, Op. 72 (1884)
Hermann Goetz
Piano Trio in G minor, Op. 1 (1863)
Alexander Goldenweiser
Piano Trio to the Memory of Rachmaninov in E minor, Op.31 (1949—1950)
Karl Goldmark
Piano Trio No. 1 in B major, Op. 4 (1865)
Piano Trio No. 2 in E minor, Op. 33 (ca. 1877)

Rubin Goldmark
Trio in D minor, Op. 1 (ca. 1900)
Julia Gomelskaya
Fantasia on themes of "Porge and Bess" (1989)
"dive deep in a rhythm-risk-riot..." (2005)
Annie Gosfield
Cranks and Cactus Needles (2000, trio version 2017)
Konstantia Gourzi
music flows across the sea, Op. 60a (2015)
Théodore Gouvy
Piano Trio No. 1 in E major, Op. 8 (1844)
Piano Trio No. 2 in A minor, Op. 18 (1847)
Piano Trio No. 3 in B-flat major, Op. 19 (1855)
Piano Trio No. 4 in F major, Op. 22 (1858)
Piano Trio No. 5 Op. 33 (1860)
Paul Graener
Suite for Piano Trio, Op. 19
"Hungerpastor"-Kammermusikdichtung for Trio, Op. 20 (1906)
Piano Trio, Op. 61 (1923)
Theodor Storm-Musik, Op. 93
Enrique Granados
Piano Trio in C major, Op. 50, H. 140 (1895)
Clémence de Grandval
Piano Trio No. 1 (1849)
Piano Trio No. 2 in E-flat major, ICG 21 (1853)
Maria Grenfell
A Feather of Blue (2000)
Alexander Gretchaninov
Piano Trio No. 1 in C minor, Op. 38 (1906)
Piano Trio No. 2 in G major, Op. 128 (1931)
Deirdre Gribbin
How to Make the Water Sound (1997)
Are you the Dream Catcher (2010)
Edvard Grieg
Andante con moto, C minor, BoSE 137 (1878)
Galina Grigorjeva
Postlude [Postlüüd] (2012)
Jorge Grundman
A walk across adolescence (2011)
César Guerra-Peixe
Piano Trio (1960)
Elizabeth Gyring
Trio-Fantasy for Piano Trio (1954)

H

Daron Hagen
Piano Trio No. 1: "Trio Concertante" for violin, cello, and piano (1984)
Piano Trio No. 2: "J'entends" for violin, cello, and piano (1986)
Piano Trio No. 3: "Wayfaring Stranger" for violin, cello, and piano (2006)
Piano Trio No. 4: "Angel Band" for violin, cello, and piano (2007)
Piano Trio No. 5: "Red is the Rose" for violin, cello, and piano (2017)
Piano Trio No. 6: "Horszowski" for violin, cello, and piano (2017)
Piano Trio No. 7: "Wintergreen" for violin, cello, and piano (2019)
Piano Trio No. 8: "Pacifica" for violin, cello, and piano (2020)
Gustaf Hägg
Piano Trio in g minor, Op. 15 (1896)

Intermezzo (1896)
James Harley
Troi for violin, violoncello, piano (2006)
Pamela Harrison
Piano Trio (1967)
Emil Hartmann
Piano Trio No. 1 in F minor
Piano Trio No. 2 in B major, Op.10 (1867)
Joseph Haydn
Piano Trios, H XV 1-45 (1766 - 1797)
David Philip Hefti
Schattenspie(ge)l Trio for Violin, Cello and Piano (2006)
Peter Arnold Heise
Piano Trio in E-flat major (1869)
Stephen Heller
Intermezzo in E major (1842)
Moya Henderson
Waking up the Flies for Piano Trio (1990)
Swan Hennessy
Lieder an den Mond, Op. 10 (1888)
Fini Henriques
Børne-Trio/Kinder-Trio in G major, Op. 31 (1909)
Adolf von Henselt
Trio in A minor, Op. 24 (1851) 
Hans Werner Henze
Kammersonate (1948, rev. 1963)
Adagio adagio (1993)
Henri Herz
Piano Trio in A major, Op. 54 (1830)
Heinrich von Herzogenberg
Piano Trio (1862–63)
Piano Trio in B minor, WoO 37 (1869?)
Piano Trio No.1 in C minor, op.24 (1875–76)
Piano Trio No.2 in D minor, op.36 (1882)
Jennifer Higdon
Piano Trio (can be performed together with Color Through) (2003)
Color Through (can be performed together with Piano Trio) (2003)
Lullaby 
Love Sweet
Dash (2001)

 
Wilhelm Hill
Piano Trio No. 1 in D major, Op. 12 (1863)
Piano Trio No. 2 in G major, Op. 43 (1878)
Ferdinand Hiller
Piano Trio No. 6 in C minor (Serenade No. 2), Op. 186 (1880s?)
Dorothy Hindman
Jerusalem Windows (2002)
E. T. A. Hoffmann
Piano Trio in E major, AV. 52 (1809)
Dulcie Holland
Fantasy Trio (1938)
Trio for Violin, Cello and Piano (1944)
Cradle Song for a Special Child (piano trio version: 1995)
Robin Holloway
Piano Trio (2018)
Leonie Holmes
...when expectation ends (2014)
Katherine Hoover
Trio for Piano Trio, Op. 14 (1978)
Egil Hovland
Trio for Piano Trio, Op. 48 (1965)
Piano Trio (1977)
Emily Howard
Broken Hierarchies II (2009)
Mary Howe
Suite mélancolique for Piano Trio (1931)
An-lun Huang (1949-)
Piano Trio No. 1 in D minor, Op. 30
Piano Trio No. 2 in B major, Op. 83
Hans Huber
Piano Trio No. 1 in E major, Op. 20
Piano Trio No. 2 in E, Op. 65 (pub. 1883)
Piano Trio No. 3 in F, Op. 105 (pub. 1890)
Eine Bergnovelle (after E. Zahn's "Bergvolk", Trio No. 4, Op. 120)
Johann Nepomuk Hummel
Piano Trio No, 1 in E major, Op. 12 (1803)
Piano Trio No. 2 in F major, Op. 22 (1807)
Piano Trio No. 3 in G major, Op. 35 (1811)
Piano Trio No. 4 in G major, Op. 65 (1815)
Piano Trio No. 5 in E major, Op. 83 (1820)
Piano Trio No. 6 in E major, Op. 93 (1826)
Piano Trio No. 7 in E major, Op. 96 (1826)
William Hurlstone
Piano Trio in G major (1905)
Henry Holden Huss
Piano Trio in D minor, Op. 23 "The Munich" (1886)
Miriam Hyde
Fantasy Trio in B minor, Op. 26 (1932-3)
Fantasia on 'Waltzing Matilda' for Piano Trio, Op. 40c (1936)

I
John Ireland
Phantasy-Trio in A minor (1906)
Piano Trio No. 2 in E minor (1917)
Piano Trio No. 3 (1938)
Charles Ives
Piano Trio, S. 86 (1904–11)

J
Salomon Jadassohn
Piano Trio 1 in F major, Op.16 (1858)
Piano Trio 2 in E major, Op.20 (1860)
Piano Trio 3 in C minor, Op.59 (1880)
Piano Trio 4 in C minor, Op.85 (1887)
Marie Jaëll
Piano Trio (1881)
Betsy Jolas
Trio 88 (1988)
"Ah! Haydn" (2007)
Joseph Jongen
Piano Trio in B minor, Op. 10 (1897)
Trio for Violin, Viola, and Piano, Op. 30 (1907)
Deux pieces en trio, Op. 95 (1931)
John Joubert
Landscapes for soprano and piano trio, Op. 129 (1992)
Paul Juon
Piano Trio No. 1 in A minor, Op.17 (1901)
Trio-Caprice on Selma Lagerlof's "Gosta Berling" in B minor, Op. 39 [Trio No. 2] (1908)
Piano Trio No. 3 in G major, Op. 60 (1915)
Litaniae. Tone Poem in C minor, Op. 70 [Trio No. 4] (1918, rev.1929)
Legend in D minor, Op. 83 [Trio No. 5] (1930)
Suite in C major, Op. 89 (1932)

K

Mauricio Kagel
Piano Trio No. 1 (1984/85)
Piano Trio No. 2 (2001)
Piano Trio No. 3 (2007)
Robert Kahn
Piano Trio No. 1 in E major, op. 19 (1893)
Piano Trio No. 2 in E major, op. 33 (1900)
Piano Trio No. 3 in C minor, op. 35 (1902)
Piano Trio No. 4 in E minor, op. 72 (1922)
Friedrich Kalkbrenner
Piano Trio No. 1 in E minor, Op. 7 (ca.1810)
Piano Trio No. 2 in A major, Op. 14 (ca. 1813)
Piano Trio No. 3 in B major, Op. 26 (1816)
Piano Trio No. 4 in D major, Op. 84 (1827)
Piano Trio No. 5 in A major, Op. 149 (1841)
Sonata in B major for piano, cello and flute (or violin)  op. 39 (ca. 1820)
Laura Kaminsky
Vukovar Trio (1999)
Piano Trio (2007)
Emanuel Kania
Piano Trio in G minor (1867)
Leokadiya Kashperova
Piano Trio in D major, Op. 3 (1904)
Piano Trio Nr. 2 (1912, unpublished)
Piano Trio in A minor (Op. Posth.)
Elena Kats-Chernin
Gypsy Ramble (1999)
A-void-ance (2002)
Eliza Aria (2004/2012)   
The Spirit and the Maiden (2004)
Calliope Dreaming (2009) 
Brothers (2020) 
Take me along (2020)
Hugo Kaun
Piano Trio No. 1 in B major, Op. 32 (published 1896) 
Piano Trio No. 2 in C minor, Op. 58 (published 1904)

Piano Trio No. 1 (1934)
Piano Trio No. 2 (1940)
Piano Trio No. 3 (1957) 
Piano Trio No. 4 (1972)
Piano Trio No. 5 (1978)
Piano Trio No. 6 (1979)
Piano Trio No. 7 (1979)
Dorothy Ker
Onaia (2013-2014)

Canto sferico (2016/17)

Frida Kern
Piano Trio, Op. 15 (1933)
Friedrich Kiel
Piano Trio No. 1 in D major, Op. 3 (1850)
Piano Trio No. 2 in A major, Op. 22 (1861)
Piano Trio No. 3 in E major, Op. 24 (1861)
Piano Trio No. 4 in C minor, Op. 33 (1863)
Piano Trio No. 5 in G major, Op. 34 (1864)
Piano Trio No. 6 in G major, Op. 65, No. 1 (written 1871, published 1875)
Piano Trio No. 7 in G minor, Op. 65, No. 2 (written 1871, published 1875) 
Wilhelm Kienzl
Piano Trio in F minor, Op.13 (1880)
Leon Kirchner
Piano Trio No. 1 (1954)
Piano Trio No. 2 (1993)
Theodor Kirchner
Novelletten, Op. 59
Bunte Blätter, Op. 83
Natalie Klouda
Fantasy Triptych (2017)
August Klughardt
Piano trio in B major, Op. 47 (1885)
Julia Klumpke
Piano Trio
Hans von Koessler
Trio-Suite in A minor for violin, viola, and piano (1922 or earlier)
Nikolai Korndorf
Are You Ready Brother Trio for piano, violin and cello (1996)
Erich Wolfgang Korngold
Piano Trio in D major, Op. 1 (1910)
Viktor Kosenko
Classical Trio for Violin, Cello and Piano in D major, Op. 17 (1927)
Dina Koston
Piccolo Trio (2002)
Mathilde Kralik
Piano Trio in F major (1880)
Joseph Martin Kraus
6 Hoffstetter Trios (lost)
Piano Trio in D major
Rafael Kubelík
Trio concertante (1988)
Toivo Kuula
Piano Trio, Op. 7 (1908)
Elisabeth Kuyper
Piano Trio in D major, Op. 13 (1909-1911)

L

Fernand de La Tombelle
Piano Trio in A minor, Op.35 (1894)
Paul Lacombe
Piano Trio No. 1 in G major, Op. 12 (1870)
Piano Trio No. 2, Op. 90
Sérénade humoristique, Trio for violin, cello and piano, Op. 93 (1898)
Piano Trio No. 3 in A minor, Op. 134 (1909)
László Lajtha
Trio concertante, Op. 10 (1928)
Édouard Lalo
Piano Trio No. 1 in C minor, Op. 7 (1849/50)
Piano Trio No. 2 in B minor (Ode on Music "Descend, ye Nine?") (c.1852)
Piano Trio No. 3 in A minor, Op. 26 (1880)
Marta Lambertini
Los fuegos de San Telmo for Piano Trio (1985)
La casa inundada for Piano Trio (1995)
Peter Lange-Müller
Piano Trio in F-minor, Op.53 (1898)
Libby Larsen
Trio (2001)
Hannah Lash
Around (2015)
Sylvio Lazzari
Piano trio in G minor, Op. 13 (1889)
Luise Adolpha Le Beau
Piano Trio in D minor, Op. 15 (1879)
Nicola LeFanu
Piano Trio (2003)
Helvi Leiviskä
Piano Trio (1924)
Meditatio for Piano Trio (1933)
Guillaume Lekeu
Piano Trio in C minor (1889-1891)
Artur Lemba
Piano Trio No. 1 in B major (1929)
Piano Trio No. 2 (1933)
Piano Trio No. 3 (1935)
Piano Trio No. 4 (1958)

Tania Léon
Elegia a Paul Robeson for Piano Trio (1987)
Lowell Liebermann
Piano Trio No. 1, Op. 32 (1990)
Piano Trio No. 2, Op. 77 (2001)
Piano Trio No. 3, Op. 122 (2012)
Helene Liebmann
Piano Trio in A major, Op. 11 (ca. 1816)
Piano Trio in D major, Op. 12 (ca. 1816)
Dinu Lipatti
Improvisation for Piano Trio
Franz Liszt
Rhapsodie Hongroise No. 9 - Le Carnaval de Pesth [S.379a] (1855)
Orpheus. Symphonic Poem (transcribed by Camille Saint-Saëns) 
Piano Trio La Lugubre Gondola (1882), also arranged for piano solo
Henry Charles Litolff
Piano Trio No. 1 in D minor, Op. 47 (1850) 
Piano Trio No. 2, Op. 56 (ca. 1850)
Piano Trio No. 3 in C minor, Op. 100 (ca. 1854)
Kate Loder
Piano Trio (1886)
Carl Loewe
Grand Trio in G minor, Op. 12 (1821, pub. 1830)
Christophe Looten
Austrian Trio
Ivana Loudová
Trio in B Flat for violin, violoncello and piano (1986–87)
Maria de Lourdes Martins
Piano Trio, Op. 17 (1959)
Boris Lyatoshinsky
Piano Trio No. 1, Op. 7 (1922/25)
Piano Trio No. 2, Op. 41 (1942)
Gilda Lyons
Folklórico (2009)
Half Light (2014)

M

Peter Machajdik
Metaphor (for Piano Trio) (2017)
Into the Distance (for Piano Trio) (2021)
Ester Mägi
Piano Trio in D minor (1950)
Albéric Magnard
Piano Trio in F minor, Op.18 (1904-5)
Gian Francesco Malipiero
Sonata a tre (1927)
Otto Malling
Piano Trio in A minor, Op. 36 (1890)

causeries (2018)
Ursula Mamlok
Panta rhei (Time in Flux) for Piano Trio (1981)
Mana-Zucca
Piano Trio
Ljubica Marić
Torso (1996)
Dimitris Maronidis
Chaconne for Piano Trio and Electronics (2020)
Heinrich Marschner
Piano Trio no. 1 in A minor, Op.29 (1823)
Piano Trio no. 2 in G minor, Op. 111 (1841)
Piano Trio no. 3 in F minor Op.121 (1843)
Piano Trio no. 4 in D major, Op.135 (1847)
Piano Trio no. 5 in D minor, Op.138 (1848)
Piano Trio no. 6 in C minor, Op. 148 (1850?)
Piano Trio no. 7 in F, Op. 167 (1855)

Forming Sculpture - Sculpting Process (2017-2018)
Frank Martin
Trio sur des mélodies polulaires irlandaises (1925)
Žibuoklė Martinaitytė
Inhabited Silences (2010)
When The Blue Hour… (2016)
In Search Of Lost Beauty… for violin, cello, piano, electronics and video (2016)
Bohuslav Martinů
Piano Trio No. 1 ("Cinq pièces brèves"), H. 193 (1930)
Five Bergerettes for piano trio, H. 275 (1939)
Piano Trio No. 2 in D minor, H. 327 (1950)
Piano Trio No. 3 in C major, H. 332 (1951)
 Giuseppe Martucci
Piano Trio No. 1 in C major, Op. 59 (1882)
Piano Trio No. 2 in E major, Op. 62 (1883)
Joseph Marx
Trio-Phantasie (1914)
Emilie Mayer
Piano Trio in E minor
Piano Trio in E major (1845-55 ca.)
Piano Trio in D minor (1855-56 ca.)
Piano Trio in A minor (1855-61 ca.)
Piano Trio in E Minor, Op. 12 (1861)
Piano Trio in D Major, Op. 13 (1862)
Piano Trio in B Minor, Op. 16 (1862)
Joseph Mayseder
Piano Trio No. 1 in E Major, Op. 34
Piano Trio No. 2 F Major, Op. 41
Piano Trio No. 3 F Major, Op. 51
Piano Trio No. 4 in A Major, Op. 52
Piano Trio Variations, Op. 57
Piano Trio No. 5 in E minor, Op. 58 (1843)
Piano Trio No. 6 in G major, Op. 59 (1844)
Missy Mazzoli
A Thousand Tongues for violin, cello, piano and pre-recorded electronics (2011)

 
Cecilia McDowall
Colour of Blossoms (2009)
Diana McIntosh
Playback for Piano Trio (1987)
Jenny McLeod
Seascapes (2015)
Clouds (2021)
Ludwig Meinardus
Piano Trio in A minor, Op. 40
Fanny Mendelssohn
Piano Trio in D minor, Op.11 (1847, published post. 1850)
Felix Mendelssohn
Piano Trio No. 1 in D minor, Op. 49 (1839)
Piano Trio No. 2 in C minor, Op. 66 (1845)
Krzysztof Meyer
Piano Trio, Op. 50 (1980)
Kirsten Milenko
Solace (2020)
Darius Milhaud
Piano Trio, Op. 428 (1969)
Ida Moberg
Dankbarkeit-Trio (1943, lost)
Eric Moe
We Happy Few (1990)
Ernest John Moeran
Piano Trio in D major (1920)
Bernhard Molique
Piano Trio No.1 in B major, Op.27 (ca. 1847)
Piano Trio No.2 in F major, Op.52 (1858)
Claudia Molitor
After the strangely monumental (2009)
Dorothy Rudd Moore
Piano Trio No. 1 (1970)
Undine Smith Moore
Soweto (1987)
Ignaz Moscheles
Piano Trio in C minor, Op.84 (1831)
Mihály Mosonyi
Piano Trio in B flat major, Op. 1 (1851)
Gabriela Moyseowicz
Musique en trois styles for Piano Trio (1969)
Wolfgang Amadeus Mozart
Piano Trio No. 1 in B major, K. 254 (1776)
Piano Trio No. 2 in G major, K. 496 (1786)
Piano Trio No. 3 in B major, K. 502 (1786)
Piano Trio No. 4 in E major, K. 542 (1788)
Piano Trio No. 5 in C major, K. 548 (1788)
Piano Trio No. 6 in G major, K. 564 (1788)
Piano Trio in D minor, K. 442 (1783?)
Fragment in B major, K. 501a (1786)
Geraldine Mucha
Piano Trio (1995)
Robert Muczynski
Piano Trio No. 1, Op. 24 (1966)
Piano Trio No. 2, Op. 36 (1975)
Piano Trio No. 3, Op. 46 (1986-7)
Nico Muhly
Common Ground (2009)
Helena Munktell
Kleines Trio
Zae Munn
With a Vengeance (1991)
Nicole Murphy
Pearl
Surface 2 (2013)
Spinning Top (2016)

N
Eduard Nápravník
Piano Trio No.1 in G minor, Op.24 (1876)
Piano Trio No.2 in D minor, Op.62 (1897)
Lior Navok
Piano Trio (1999)
Laura Netzel
Piano Trio No. 1 in D-flat major, Serenade, Op. 50 (1895)
Piano Trio No. 2 in G minor, Preludio e fughetta, Op. 68 (1900)
Piano Trio No. 3 in D minor, Op. 78 (1903)
Olga Neuwirth
Quasare / Pulsare II (2017)
Dika Newlin
Piano Trio, Op. 2 (1948) 
Carl Nielsen
Piano Trio in G minor, FS 3i (1883)
Ib Nørholm
Piano Trio, Op. 22 (1959)
Vítězslav Novák
Piano Trio No. 1 in G minor, Op. 1 (ca. 1890)
Piano Trio No. 2 in D minor "Quasi una ballata", Op. 27 (ca. 1900)

O
Jane O'Leary
Piano Trio (1992)
George Onslow
Piano Trios Nos. 1–3 in A major, C major, G minor, Op. 3 (1807)
Piano Trios Nos. 4–6 in E minor, E major, D major, Op. 14 (1817)
Piano Trio No. 7 in D minor, Op. 20 (1822)
Piano Trio No. 8 in C minor, Op. 26 (1823)
Piano Trio No. 9 in G major, Op. 27 (1823)
Piano Trio No. 10 in F minor, Op. 83 (1851/2)
Cornélie van Oosterzee
2 Phantasiestücke for Piano Trio, Op. 18 (1900)
Morfydd Owen
Piano Trio in D major (1915)
María Luisa Ozaita
Piano Trio (1987)

P

Piano Trio No. 1 in E major
Piano Trio No. 2 in A major
Piano Trio No. 3 in F major
Piano Trio No. 5 in C major
Arvo Pärt
Mozart - Adagio for piano trio (1992/1997)
Joan Panetti
The Instant Gatherers for piano trio
Andrzej Panufnik
Piano Trio (1934)
Hilda Paredes
Alegoría Tri-partita (2008)
Hubert Parry
Piano Trio No. 1 in E minor (1878)
Robert Paterson
Sun Trio (1995/rev. 2008)
Moon Trio (2015)
Dora Pejačević
Piano Trio No. 1 in D Major, Op. 15 (1902)
Piano Trio No. 2 in C Major, Op. 29 (1910)
Barbara Pentland
Piano Trio (1963)
Zenobia Powell Perry
Excursions for Piano Trio (1989)
Carmen Petra Basacopol
Piano Trio (1959)
Hans Pfitzner
Piano Trio in B Major (1886)
Piano Trio in F Major, Op.8 (1890-1896)
Willem Pijper
Trio No. 1 for violin, violoncello & piano (1914)
Trio No. 2 for violin, violoncello & piano (1921)

Werner Pirchner
Wem gehört der Mensch...? PWV 31 (1988)
Heimat? PWV 29a (1992)
Johann Peter Pixis
Piano Trio no. 1 in E Major, Op.75 (ca. 1790, publ. 1825)
Piano Trio no. 2 in F Major, Op.86 (1827)
Piano Trio no. 3 in B minor, Op.95 (ca. 1828)
Piano Trio no. 4 in E Major, Op.118 (1832)
Piano Trio no. 5 in C Major, Op.129 (1836)
Piano Trio no. 6 in F minor, Op.139 (1839)
Piano Trio no. 7 in D minor, Op.145 (1845)
Ildebrando Pizzetti
Piano trio in G minor (1900)
Piano trio in A major (1925)
Ignaz Joseph Pleyel
Piano Trio in G Major, Op. 16, no. 2, Ben. 432
Piano Trio in E minor, Op. 16, no. 5, Ben. 435
Piano Trio in B Major, Ben. 440
Piano Trio in C Major, Ben. 441 (1790s?)
Piano Trio in F minor, Ben. 442
Piano Trio in A Major, Ben. 448 (1790s?)
Piano Trio in D Major, Op. 29, Ben. 461
Piano Trio in F Major, Op. 47, No. 1, Ben. 474
Gerhard Präsent
Trio intricato (1983–1985)
Tête-à-tête-à-tête (1995/98)
Melodic Pieces (2004–06)
Teresa Procaccini
Piano Trio, Op. 53 (1956)

Masslosigkeit for Piano Trio (2007)
Salute a te, o divino pidocchio lunare (2014)
Mirabilia Mundi I - Semiramidis Horti Pensiles (2015)
musique noire IV for piano trio (2020)

R

Sergei Rachmaninoff
Trio Elégiaque No. 1 in G minor, Op. posth. (1892)
Trio Elégiaque No. 2 in D minor, Op. 9 (1893)
Vocalise - Arranged for violin, cello and piano (1912)
Robert Radecke
Piano Trio in B major, WoO 111 (1851)
Piano Trio No. 1 in A major, Op. 30, composed by 1851 (reworked and pub. 1864)
Piano Trio No. 2 in B minor, Op. 33
Joachim Raff
Piano Trio No. 1 in C minor, Op. 102 (1861)
Piano Trio No. 2 in G major, Op. 112 (1863)
Piano Trio No. 3 in A minor, Op. 155 (1870)
Piano Trio No. 4 in D major, Op. 158 (1870)
Priaulx Rainier
Suite en Trio (1960)
Shulamit Ran
Excursions (1980)
Soliloquy (1997)
Behzad Ranjbaran
Shiraz for Piano Trio (2006)
François Rasse
Piano Trio No. 1 in B minor, Op.16 (1897)
Piano Trio No. 2 (1911)
Piano Trio No. 3 (1951)
Santa Ratniece
entasis (2021)
Elizabeth Raum
Rondo Variations for piano, violin, and double bass (or cello) (1989)
Searching for Sophia (1995)
Cinderella Suite (1996)
White Horse Inn By Moonlight (2010)
Maurice Ravel
Piano Trio in A minor (1914)
Napoléon Henri Reber
Piano Trio No.1 in A major, Op.8 (1837)
Piano Trio No.2 in E major, Op.12 Published 1825.
Piano Trio No.3 in G minor, Op.16 (1862)
Piano Trio No.4 'Sérénade' in D major, Op.25 (1864)
Piano Trio No.5 in C major, Op.30 (1872)
Piano Trio No.6 in E major, Op.34 (1876)
Piano Trio No.7 in A minor, Op.37 (1880)
Max Reger
Trio for Violin, Viola, and Piano in B minor, Op. 2 (1891)
Piano Trio in E minor, Op. 102 (1907)
Karin Rehnqvist
BEGINNING (Begynnelsen) (2003)
Anton Reicha
Sonata for Piano, Violin and Cello in C major, Op. 47 (pub. 1804)
Six Trios Concertants for piano, violin and cello (E-flat major, D minor, C major, F major, D major, A major), Op. 101 (Paris, 1824)
Trio (1824)
Trio (?)
Michèle Reverdy
En terre inconnue for Piano Trio (1992)
Fragments d'un discours - Hommage à Clara Schumann (2018)
Josef Rheinberger
Piano Trio in D minor, Op. 34 (1862, revised 1867)
Piano Trio in A major, Op. 112 (1878)
Piano Trio No. 3 in B major, Op. 121 (1880)
Piano Trio No. 4 in F major, Op. 191 (1898) (Rheinberger Trios MDG 303 0419-2 [JW]: Classical CD Reviews- January 2005 MusicWeb(UK)), also arranged as a sextet for piano, strings & winds

Ferdinand Ries
Piano Trio in E major, Op.2 (1807)
Piano Trio in B major, Op.28 for piano, clarinet & cello (1810)
Piano Trio in E major, Op.63 for piano, flute & cello (1815)
Piano Trio in C minor, Op.143 (1826)
Wolfgang Rihm
Trio (1972)
Fremde Szenen I. - III. Versuche für Klaviertrio (1982/84)
Sarah Rimkus
Sunset Boulevard (2014)
Nikolai Rimsky-Korsakov
Trio in C minor, for violin, violoncello, and piano, 1897; completed by his son-in-law Maximilian Steinberg in 1939
Malcolm D Robertson
Piano Trio (2018-2019)
George Rochberg
Piano Trio No. 1 (1963)
Piano Trio No. 2 (1985)
Piano Trio No. 3 "Summer, 1990" (1990)
Kurt Roger
Trio in E major, Op. 77 (1953)
Elena Romero
Fantasía española for Piano Trio (1952)
Divertimento for Piano Trio (1983)
Lucia Ronchetti
Opus 100 - Criptomnesie da Schubert (2005)
Julius Röntgen
Piano Trio No. 1 in B major, Op. 23 (1883)
Piano Trio No. 2 in D major (1898)
Piano Trio No. 3 in G minor (1898)
Piano Trio No. 4 in C minor, Op. 50 (1904)
in addition to 10 other piano trios written between the years 1883 and 1932
Amanda Röntgen-Maier
Piano Trio in E-flat major (1873-1874)
Nikolai Roslavets
Piano Trio No. 1 (1913) — published ca. 1913 by Grosse
Piano Trio No. 2 (lost)
Piano Trio No. 3 (1920) — published 1929
Piano Trio No. 4 (1939) (incomplete score)
Piano Trio No. 5 (1941) — Schott ED 8128
Albert Roussel
Piano Trio in E major, Op. 2 (1902, rev. 1927)
Edmund Rubbra
Piano Trio in One Movement, Op. 68 (1950)
Piano Trio No. 2, Op. 138 (1970) (EDMUND RUBBRA (1901-1986) A COMPACT BIOGRAPHY  and CD Reviews by Rob Barnett)
Anton Rubinstein
Piano Trio No. 1 in F major, Op. 15/1 (1851)
Piano Trio No. 2 in G minor, Op. 15/2 (1851)
Piano Trio No. 3 in B major, Op. 52 (1857)
Piano Trio No. 4 in A major, Op. 85 (1871)
Piano Trio No. 5 in C minor, Op. 108 (1883)
Elena Ruehr
The Scarlatti Effect (1997)
Blackberries (2007)
Joseph Ryelandt
Piano Trio No. 1 in B minor, Op. 57 (1915)
Piano Trio No. 2, Op. 131 (1944)

S

Kaija Saariaho
Light and Matter for Piano Trio (2014)
Leonid Sabaneyev
Trio Impromptu for Piano Trio in d minor, Op. 4 (1907)
Piano Trio, Op. 20, Sonata (1924)
Camille Saint-Saëns
Piano Trio No. 1 in F major, Op. 18 (1863)
Piano Trio No. 2 in E minor, Op. 92 (1892)
Claudio Santoro
Piano Trio (1973)
Fazıl Say
Space Jump for Piano Trio, Op. 46 (2013)
Philipp Scharwenka
Piano Trio No. 1 in F minor, Op. 26
Piano Trio No. 2 in C minor, Op. 100 (1897)
Duo for Violin & Viola with Piano (Piano Trio No. 3) in A major, Op. 105 (1898)
Piano Trio No. 4 in G major, Op. 112 (1902)
Piano Trio No. 5 in E minor, Op.121 (1915)
Xaver Scharwenka
Piano Trio No. 1 in F minor, Op. 1 (1868)
Piano Trio No. 2 in A minor, Op. 45 (1878)
Lalo Schifrin
Hommage à Ravel (1995)
Florent Schmitt
Sonatine en trio, Op. 85b
Friedrich Schneider
Piano Trio in E major, Op. 38 (1816)
Alfred Schnittke
Piano Trio (arrangement made in 1992 of string trio (1985))
Arnold Schoenberg
Verklärte Nacht for Violin, Cello and Piano, Op. 4 (arr. E. Steuermann) (1899)
Paul Schoenfield
Café Music
Franz Schubert
Piano Trio in B major "Sonatensatz", D. 28 (1812)
Piano Trio in E major "Notturno" (Adagio only), D. 897, Op. post. 148 (1828)
Piano Trio No. 1 in B major, D. 898, Op. 99 (1828)
Piano Trio No. 2 in E major, D. 929, Op. 100 (1827)
Gunther Schuller
 Piano Trio (1984)
Clara Schumann
Trio for piano, violin & cello in G minor, Op. 17 (1846)
Georg Schumann
Piano Trio No.1 in F major, Op.25 (1899)
Piano Trio No.2 in F major, Op.62 (1915)
Robert Schumann
Fantasiestücke in A minor, Op.88 (1842)
Studien. 6 Stücke in canonischer Form Op. 56 (arr. Th. Kirchner) (1845)
Piano Trio No. 1 in D minor, Op. 63 (1847)
Piano Trio No. 2 in F major, Op. 80 (1847)
Piano Trio No. 3 in G minor, Op. 110 (1851)
Laura Schwendinger
C'e la Luna Questa Sera? (2006)
Arc of Fire (2013)
Cyril Scott
Piano Trio in E minor, Op. 3 (c. 1899)
Piano Trio No. 1 (1920)
Piano Trio No. 2 (1950)
Piano Trio No. 3 (1957)
Peter Seabourne
Last Dance (2010)
Piano Trio (2018)
Hilda Sehested
Intermezzi for Piano Trio (1904)
Charlotte Seither
Champlève (1994)
Equal Ways of Difference (2011)
Johanna Senfter
Piano Trio, Op. 21
Piano Trio, Op. 47 
Piano Trio, Op. 54
Piano Trio, Op. 134
Vache Sharafyan 
Piano Trio 1 (2000)
Piano Trio #2 "Dream of dreams" (2004)
Piano Trio #3 "Moonlight over Jerusalem" (2013)
"Continuations" four movements for Piano Trio (2012)
Rodion Shchedrin
Piano-Terzetto for Piano Trio (1995)
Three Funny Pieces for Piano Trio (1997)
Vissarion Shebalin
Piano Trio in A major, Op. 39 (1946/47)
Dmitri Shostakovich
Piano Trio No. 1 in C minor, Op. 8 (1923)
Piano Trio No. 2 in E minor, Op. 67 (1944)
Marilyn Shrude
Raining Glass (2002)
Sotto Voce (2012)
Jean Sibelius
Piano Trio No. 1 in A minor, JS 206 (1884)
Allegro for Piano Trio, JS 27 (1886)
Piano Trio No. 2 in A minor "Havträsk trio", JS 207 (1886)
Piano Trio No. 3 in D major "Korpo trio", JS 209 (1887)
Andantino for Piano Trio, JS 43 (1887-8)
Piano Trio No. 4 in C major "Lovisa trio", JS 208 (1888)

Arlene Sierra
Truel (2004)
Butterflies Remember a Mountain (2013)
Sheila Silver
To the Spirit Unconquered (1992)
Faye-Ellen Silverman
Reconstructed Music for Piano Trio (2002)
Valentyn Silvestrov
"Drama" for violin, cello and piano (1971)
Christian Sinding
Piano Trio No. 1, Op.23 in D major (1893)
Piano Trio No. 2, Op.64a in A minor (1902)
Piano Trio No. 3, Op.87 in C major (1908)
Nikos Skalkottas
Piano Trio (1936)
Eight Variations for Piano Trio (on a Greek Folk Tune) (1938)
Bedřich Smetana
Piano Trio in G minor, JB 1:64, Op. 15 (1855)
Alice Mary Smith
Piano Trio in G major (1872)
Julia Smith (composer)
Cornwall Trio (1966)
Linda Catlin Smith
Ribbon (2001)
Far From Shore (2010)
Dreamer Murmuring (2014)
Ethel Smyth
Trio for violin, cello and piano in D minor (1880)

Petite suite, Op. 13 (1921)
Trio, Op. 24 (1931)
Bent Sørensen
Phantasmagoria (2007)
Abgesänge (2015)
Marcelle Soulage
Piano Trio in A minor, Op. 34 (1922)
Louis Spohr
Piano Trio No.1 in E minor, Op.119 (1841)
Piano Trio No.2 in F major, Op.123 (1842)
Piano Trio No.3 in A minor, Op.124 (1842)
Piano Trio No.4 in B major, Op.133 (1846)
Piano Trio No.5 in G minor, Op.142 (1849)
Charles Villiers Stanford
Piano Trio No. 1 in E major, Op. 35 (1889)
Piano Trio No. 2 in G minor, Op. 73 (1899)
Piano Trio No. 3 in A minor "Per aspera ad astra", Op. 158 (1918)
Iet Stants
Piano Trio (1925)
Piano Trio (1938)
Gitta Steiner
Piano Trio (1985)
Carlos Stella
Brahms im Spiegelkabinett
Constantin von Sternberg
Piano Trio No.1, Op.69 (1895)
Piano Trio No.2 in F minor, Op.79 (1898)
Piano Trio No.3 in C major, Op.104 (1912)
Aus Italien for Piano Trio, Op.105 (1912)
Ingrid Stölzel
The Road is All (2007)
Richard Stöhr
Piano Trio in E major, Op. 16 (1905)
Piano Trio in C major, Op. 77 (1942)
Piano Trio in C minor, Op. 97 (1943)
Piano Trio in A minor, Op. 100 (1944)
Richard Stoker
Piano Trio No.1, Op.24 (1964)
Piano Trio No.2, Op.35 (1969)
Piano Trio No.3, Op.59 (1980)
Richard Strauss
Piano Trio No. 1 in A major, AV.37 (1877)
Piano Trio No. 2 in D major, AV.53 (1878)
Rita Strohl
Piano Trio No. 1 in G minor (1884)
Piano Trio No. 2 in D minor
Constantinos Stylianou
Pride (2008)
Josef Suk
Piano Trio in C minor, Op. 2 (1889)
Elegie for Piano Trio, Op. 23 (1902)
Sveinbjörn Sveinbjörnsson
Piano Trio in A minor
Piano Trio in E minor
Georgy Sviridov
Piano Trio in A minor, Op. 61 (1945 - rev. 1955)
Tomáš Svoboda
Passacaglia & Fugue, Op. 87 
Phantasy, Op. 120 (1985)
Trio (van Gogh), Op. 116 (1984)
Edith Swepstone
Piano Trio in D minor
Piano Trio in G minor
Piano Trio in A minor
Iris Szeghy
Poetische Studien (1984)

T

Ellen Taaffe Zwilich
Piano Trio (1987)
Pas de Trois for Piano Trio (2016)
Germaine Tailleferre
Piano Trio (1917/1978)
Jenő Takács
Trio-Rhapsodie Op. 11 (1926)
Toru Takemitsu
Between tides (1993)
Josef Tal
Trio for violin, cello & piano (1973)
Sergei Taneyev
Piano Trio in D major, Op. 22 (1908)
Hilary Tann
Nothing Forgotten (1997)
... Slate, Blue-Gray (2012)
Alexandre Tansman
Piano Trio No. 2 (1939)

Akacia for Piano Trio (2009)
Moorlands for Piano Trio (2018)
Boris Tchaikovsky
Piano Trio in B minor (1953)
Pyotr Ilyich Tchaikovsky
Piano Trio in A minor, Op. 50 (1882)
Thomas Tellefsen
Piano Trio in B-flat major, Op. 31 (1861-1862)
Sigismond Thalberg
Piano Trio in A major, Op. 69 
Louis Thirion
Piano Trio in A minor, Op.11 (1911)
Augusta Read Thomas
...a circle around the sun... (2000)
Moon Jig (2005)
Klee Musings (2016)

Francis Thomé
Piano Trio in A major, Op.121 (1893)
Ludwig Thuille
Piano Trio in E major for violin, viola and piano, Op. Post. (1885)
Zlata Tkach
Piano Trio No. 1 (1961)
Piano Trio No. 2 (1996)
Piano Trio (2001)
Decem (2006)
Malagueña ausente (2016)
Spes (2020)
Piano Trio No. 2. Elegía española (2022)
Donald Tovey
Piano Trio in B minor, Op.1 (1895)
Piano Trio in C minor, Op. 8, "Style tragique" (1895)
Piano Trio in D major, Op.27 (1910)
Joan Tower
And ... They're Off for Piano Trio (1997)
Big Sky for Piano Trio (2000)
For Daniel for Piano Trio (2004)
Trio Cavany for Piano Trio (2007)
Joan Trimble
Phantasy Trio for Piano Trio (1940)
Karmella Tsepkolenko
Royal Flush - Card Game No. 1 (1992)
Helena Tulve
lumineux/opaque (2002, for violin, cello, piano, 3 wine glasses)
Joaquín Turina
Piano Trio in F major (1904)
Piano Trio No. 1, Op. 35 (1926)
Piano Trio No. 2 in B minor, Op. 76 (1933)
Circulo, for piano trio, Op. 91 (1942)
Mark-Anthony Turnage
A short procession, for piano trio (2003)
Marcel Tyberg
Piano Trio in F major (1935-1936)

U
Ludmila Ulehla
In memoriam for Piano Trio (1972)
Erich Urbanner
"...in Bewegung..." Trio for violin, cello, and piano (1990)

V

Nancy Van de Vate
Piano Trio (1983)
Pēteris Vasks
Episodi e Canto Perpetuo (1985)
Vientuļais eņģelis (1999/2019)
Plainscapes (2011)
Octavio Vázquez
Piano Trio "Guernica" (2006)
Lucie Vellère
Piano Trio (1947)
Elizabeth Walton Vercoe
Despite our differences #1 (1984)
Sándor Veress
Tre quadri (1963)
Alice Verne-Bredt
Phantasie Trio (1908)
Piano Trio No. 2
Piano Trio No. 3

Alba Rosa Viëtor
Canzonetta (1939)
Piano Trio in A Minor (1951)
Heitor Villa-Lobos
Piano Trio No. 1 (1911)
Piano Trio No. 2 (1915)
Piano Trio No. 3 (1918)
Pancho Vladigerov
Trio in B-flat minor, Op. 4 (1916)
Robert Volkmann
Piano Trio No. 1 in F major, Op. 3 (1843)
Piano Trio No. 2 in B-flat minor, Op. 5 (ca. 1845)
Aleksandra Vrebalov
Passion Revisited (2005)
Victor Vreuls
Piano Trio in D minor, Op. 1 (1896)

W

Julian Wagstaff
A Persistent Illusion (2011)(Wagstaff: Breathe Freely | Linn Records)
Gwyneth Van Anden Walker
Salem Reel (1989)
Craftsbury Trio for Piano Trio (or Clarinet, Cello, and Piano) (1990) 
New World Dances (1992)
A Vision of Hills (2002)
Interval Games (2002)
Footsteps of Spring for Piano Trio, Narrator (2004)
Ladders to the Sky (2005)
The Race - A fable for Piano Trio and Narrator (2008)
Mornings of Creation (2015)
The Northlands (2015)
Shadows and Light (2015) 
Let Us Break Bread Together (2017)
Benediction: To Hold in the Light (2017)
Suddenly Calm (2017)
Shall We Gather at the River (2020)
Wayfaring Stranger (2020)
Where There Is Hope (2020) 
Joelle Wallach
Triad of Blessing
Henry Waldo Warner
Piano Trio in A Minor, Op. 22 (1907)
Graham Waterhouse
Polish Suite, Op. 3 (1978) 
Bei Nacht, Op. 50 (1999)
Canto Notturno (2009)
Bells of Beyond (2013)
Karl Weigl
Trio (1938/39)

Douglas Weiland
First Trio, Op. 22 (1995)
Second Trio, Op.32 "Pavey Ark" (2002)
Mieczysław Weinberg
Piano Trio, Op. 24 (1945)
Judith Weir
Piano Trio (1998)
Piano Trio Two (2003-2004)
Lotta Wennäkoski
Kilpukka ja muita lauluja (2001)
Päärme (“Hem”) (2014-2015)
Kenny Wheeler
A little peace for piano trio (2002)
Gillian Whitehead
Piano Trio (1972)
Piano Trio (2005)
Charles-Marie Widor
Piano Trio in B major, Op.19 (1874)
Soirs d'Alsace Four Duos for Violin, Cello and Piano, Op. 52 (1881)
Four Pièces for Violin, Cello and Piano (1890)
Józef Wieniawski
Piano Trio in G major, Op. 40 (1885)
Ermanno Wolf-Ferrari
Piano Trio No.1 in D major, Op.5 (1898)
Piano Trio No.2 in F major, Op.7 (1900)
John Woolrich
The Night will not draw on (2008)
Toward the black sky (1997)
Charles Wuorinen
Trio for Violin, Cello and Piano (1983)

Y
Sergei Yuferov
Piano Trio in C minor, Op. 52 (1913)
Isang Yun
Trio (1972/75)
Ludmila Yurina
Klangillusion II (2002)

Z

Alla Zahaikevych
Trio (1991)
Jeanne Zaidel-Rudolph
Wits Trio Tribute (2013)
Alma Mater (2017)
Judith Lang Zaimont
Russian Summer (1989)
Zones - Piano Trio No. 2 (1994)      
Serenade (adapted for Violin, Cello and Piano) (2008) 
Edson Zampronha
O Acorde Invisível (The Invisible Chord) (2010)
Riccardo Zandonai
Trio serenata per violino, violoncello e pianoforte
Isidora Žebeljan
Sarabande (2001/13)
Władysław Żeleński
Piano Trio in E major, Op.22 (1875)
Alexander von Zemlinsky
Trio for clarinet (or violin), cello and piano in D minor, Op. 3 (1896)
Marilyn J. Ziffrin
Piano Trio (1975)

Hermann Zilcher
Piano Trio (1896)
Piano Trio in E minor, Op. 56 (1926)
Agnes Zimmermann
Suite for Piano Trio in D minor, Op. 19 (c. 1873–1875)
Bernd Alois Zimmermann
Présence. Ballet blanc en cinq scènes (1961)
Djuro Zivkovic
Piano Trio (2001)
Mirjana Živković
Lyric Trio [Lirski trio] for Piano Trio (1979)
John Zorn
Amour Fou (1999)
Hexentarot (2013)
The Aristos (2014)
Emiliana de Zubeldia
Trio España for Piano Trio (published 1927)
Otto M. Zykan
g-kettet (1996)
Drei Bagatellen (1998)

Other combinations for Piano Trio 
Many works also exist for less conventional groupings of instruments.  Among the most notable are:

Flute, cello and piano (Haydn Op 67, 73, Weber Op. 63  J. 259)
Trio for flute, cello and piano in G major, Hob. XV:15 (Haydn)
Trio for flute, cello and piano Op. 45 (Louise Farrenc, 1856)
Flute, Bassoon and piano (Beethoven WoO. 37, 1786–90, published 1888)
Clarinet-viola-piano trio (Mozart's Kegelstatt Trio, K 498)
Clarinet-violin-piano trio (Bartók's Contrasts)
Clarinet-cello-piano trio (Beethoven's Trio in B-flat, Op. 11, Brahms' Trio Op. 114)
Violin, horn and piano (Horn Trio (Brahms) and Trio for Violin, Horn and Piano (Ligeti) both list additional works in the medium)
Trio for piano, oboe and horn Op.61 (Herzogenberg)
Oboe, bassoon and piano (Poulenc)
Paul Hindemith Trio for heckelphone (or tenor saxophone), viola & piano, Op. 47

Of these repertoires, pieces which include ossia parts for the conventional violin-cello-piano trio include:

Ludwig van Beethoven
Trio for clarinet, cello, piano in B-flat major, Op. 11
Johannes Brahms
Trio for violin, horn (or viola) in E-flat major, Op. 40
Trio for clarinet (or viola), cello, piano in A minor, Op. 114
Max Bruch
Trio for clarinet (or violin), cello, and piano in c minor, Op. 5
Eight Pieces for clarinet (or violin), cello, and piano, Op. 83
Mikhail Glinka
Trio pathétique, for clarinet (or violin), bassoon (or cello), and piano in D minor, G. iv173

Technically not piano trios, but pieces with ossia parts for the conventional violin-cello-piano trio are:
Henriette Renié
Trio for harpe (or piano), violin and cello in B-flat major, IHR 17 (written in ca. 1901, published in ca. 1910)

See also
 List of triple concertos for violin, cello, and piano
 String instrument repertoire
 List of solo cello pieces
 List of compositions for cello and piano
 List of compositions for cello and orchestra
 List of double concertos for violin and cello
 Clarinet-violin-piano trio
 Clarinet-viola-piano trio
 Clarinet-cello-piano trio

References

Further reading

External links

 
Classical music lists